Stalachtis phaedusa is a species of butterfly of the family Riodinidae. It is found in South America.

Subspecies
Stalachtis phaedusa phaedusa
Stalachtis phaedusa duvalii (Perty, 1833) (Brazil)
Stalachtis phaedusa exul Seitz, 1917 (French Guiana)
Stalachtis phaedusa phaloe Staudinger, [1887] (Peru, Brazil: Amazonas)
Stalachtis phaedusa trangeri Schaus, 1928 (Colombia)
Stalachtis phaedusa zephyritis (Dalman, 1823) (Surinam)

References

Butterflies described in 1813
Riodininae
Riodinidae of South America
Taxa named by Jacob Hübner